Vasile Aaron is a residential district in Sibiu, Romania, located in the eastern part of the city.

The district was built during the communist era in a typical communist style of 'matchbox apartment buildings'. The district's name is given by the Vasile Aaron street that was the border between the city and the commune of Selimbar.

References 

Districts of Sibiu